Delroy George Wilson CD (5 October 1948 – 6 March 1995) was a Jamaican ska, rocksteady and reggae singer. Wilson is often regarded as Jamaica's first child star, having first found success as a teenager. His youngest son, Karl "Konan" Wilson, has found success as part of British duo Krept and Konan.

Biography
Delroy Wilson began his recording career at the age of thirteen, while still a pupil at Boys Town Primary School. Wilson released his first single "Emy Lou" in 1962 for record producer, Clement "Coxsone" Dodd. His early years with Coxsone yielded a number of ska hits, the biggest of which, the Lee Perry-written "Joe Liges" was an attack on rival producer and former Dodd employee Prince Buster. This was followed by another Perry-written attack on Buster, "Spit in the Sky". Further singles followed, including "One Two Three", "I Shall Not Remove", "Look Who Is Back Again" (a duet with Slim Smith), and another anti-Buster song, "Prince Pharaoh", notably the only record featuring the voice of Dodd himself. He is regarded as Jamaica's first child star.

His voice matured as he left his teens, around the time of ska's transition to rocksteady and this period in the late 1960s produced many hits including one of the first rocksteady records, "Dancing Mood", "Jerk in Time" (with the Wailers), "Feel Good All Over", "I'm Not a King", "True Believer in Love", "Rain From the Skies", "Conquer Me" and "Riding for a Fall". "Won't You Come Home", a duet with Ken Boothe on a rhythm originally cut by The Conquerors for Sonia Pottinger has become one of the most-versioned Jamaican tracks ever. After leaving Studio One he recorded for other labels, with varying degrees of success, and set up his own short-lived W&C label. He enjoyed success with Bunny Lee in the late 1960s and early 1970s with tracks such as "This Old Heart of Mine", "Footsteps of Another Man", and "Better Must Come". His double A-side "It Hurts"/"Put Yourself in My Place" was a skinhead favourite and narrowly missed UK chart success. He recorded a version of "Run Run", a song he had originally recorded for Dodd, for maverick producer Keith Hudson.

Wilson toured the UK and recorded for Trojan Records in 1970.

In 1972, Michael Manley's People's National Party chose Wilson's "Better Must Come" as their election campaign song. The same year saw the release of one of his most popular songs, "Cool Operator", which became his nickname. He worked with a string of producers in the years that followed, including Joe Gibbs ("Mash Up Illiteracy", "Pretty Girl"), Gussie Clarke ("Love"), Winston "Niney" Holness ("Rascal Man"), Harry J ("Ask The Lonely"), and Joseph Hoo Kim ("It's a Shame").

In 1976, he recorded a cover of The Wailers' "I'm Still Waiting" for Lloyd Charmers, which was hugely popular, and enjoyed some cross-over success, and was followed by the album Sarge, which is considered one of his strongest. Also a Bob Andy produced song, "The Last Thing on My Mind" rose to number one in Jamaica. Wilson continued to be successful until the end of the decade, but his career floundered during the early 1980s, with releases less common. His fortunes revived in the digital age with releases for King Jammy ("Don't Put The Blame on Me") and Bunny Lee ("Ease Up"), with new albums following, but he again drifted out of the limelight, with his health declining, and is best remembered for his earlier work.

Wilson is referenced by The Clash in their 1978 track "(White Man) In Hammersmith Palais". 

Delroy Wilson died at the age of 46 on 6 March 1995 at Kingston's UWI hospital, of complications from cirrhosis of the liver.

In 2013 Wilson was posthumously awarded the Order of Distinction by the Jamaican Government.

In 2015 Wilson's childhood friend Everard "Jah Ruby" Metcalf released the album The Delroy Wilson Story, featuring 21 cover versions of Wilson's songs.

Albums
I Shall Not Remove (1966) Studio One
Good All Over (1969) Coxsone/Studio One
Better Must Come (1971) Dynamic Sounds
Captivity (1973) Big Shot
For I And I (1975) Grounation
Sarge (1976) Charmers
Last Thing on My Mind (1977) Harry J
Money (1977) Clocktower
Mr. Cool Operator (1977) EJI
Lovers' Rock (1978) Burning Sounds
Who Done It (1979) Third World
True Believer in Love (197?) Carib Gems
True Believer in Love (197?) Micron
Unedited (197?) Hulk
Living in the Footsteps (1980) Joe Gibbs
Go Away Dream (1982) Black Music
Nice Times (1983) Vista Sounds
Reggae Classics (1984) Londisc
Worth Your Weight in Gold (1984) Burning Sounds
The Dean of Reggae (1985) Mister Tipsy
Looking For Love (1986) Phill Pratt
Million Busters in Reggae (198?) Top Rank
Super Mix Hits (198?) Pioneer International
Dancing Mood Studio One
Oldies But Goodies Pioneer International (with Owen Gray)
Now (19??), Real Wax
Wilson's work has also been collected on over 15 'Best of' compilations and he features on dozens of compilations of reggae and ska music.

See also
List of reggae musicians
List of roots reggae artists
Rocksteady
Lovers rock
Music of Jamaica

References

External links
Delroy Wilson at Roots Archives

1948 births
1995 deaths
Musicians from Kingston, Jamaica
Jamaican reggae musicians
Island Records artists
Recipients of the Order of Distinction